The Man Who Wanted to Kill Himself (Spanish: El hombre que se quiso matar) is a 1970 Spanish comedy film directed by Rafael Gil and starring Tony Leblanc,  and Elisa Ramírez. It is a remake of the 1942 film of the same title.

Cast

References

External links

1970 comedy films
Spanish comedy films
Films directed by Rafael Gil
Remakes of Spanish films
Films with screenplays by Rafael J. Salvia
1970s Spanish-language films
1970s Spanish films